Thethi may refer to:

Thēthi, a dialect of the Maithili language, spoken in parts of India and Nepal
Theth, a small village within Shkodër County, Albania